The Fairfield Hospital is a district hospital located in Prairiewood, a western suburb of Sydney, New South Wales, Australia. Located in the City of Fairfield, it has about 200 beds and provides general medical, physiotherapy, general surgical, obstetric, paediatric, emergency, ambulatory care, and drug health services.

In addition to its district hospital level role, Fairfield Hospital hosts two major specialist units. It hosts the major specialist hand surgery unit for South Western Sydney.  It is also the major elective orthopaedic surgery site for the area, and is the host of the Whitlam Joint Replacement Centre. Patients from Fairfield can also be transferred to Liverpool Hospital, which is the second largest hospital in the state with 900+ beds and significantly larger surgical & life support services available.

An onsite academic unit affiliated with UNSW (University of New South Wales) Medicine provides general practice services, medical education and training, and conducts primary care, health services and health informatics research.

History
The hospital opened at its current location in Prairiewood in 1988, after relocating from the old site on The Horsley Drive in Fairfield.

See also
List of hospitals in Australia

References

External links
Fairfield Hospital - Bureau of Health Information

Hospitals in Sydney
Hospitals with year of establishment missing